Croaker may refer to:

 The fish family Sciaenidae
 , a World War II submarine
 Croaker, Virginia, United States, an unincorporated community
 Croaker, a main character in The Black Company science fiction novel series - see The Black Company (novel)

See also
 Croker (disambiguation)